The March 761 was a Formula One racing car designed by Robin Herd of March Engineering for the 1976 season which saw continued use in 1977.

History

In 1976, Ronnie Peterson was unhappy with the uncompetitive Lotus 77, and returned to March for whom he scored the team's second and last win at Monza. The 761 was fast but fragile and by this point the F1 effort was being run on a shoestring with a two-car 'works' effort featuring Peterson and Hans-Joachim Stuck, the cars tending to turn up in different liveries as race-by-race sponsorship deals were signed, and a 'B-team' entered under the March Engines banner for paying drivers Lella Lombardi and Arturo Merzario. By now the F1 effort as a whole was under fairly severe pressure from BMW, which wanted Robin Herd to concentrate entirely on the works' Formula Two effort, which was starting to be outpaced by French constructors (Martini and Elf) and the new Ralt marque.

That year, Peterson scored only one other point before being brokered back into a deal with Tyrrell for 1977. Although he felt most at home at March, it was clear that the team didn't have the resources to do Formula One "properly".

A token F1 effort with Rothmans sponsorship was run in 1977 for Alex Ribeiro and Ian Scheckter, but nothing worthwhile was achieved. Yet, as the works were fading from F1 the 761, by virtue of being cheap, simple and readily available, became the tool of choice for privateers, notably Frank Williams who after his acrimonious split with Walter Wolf needed a car to get back into racing before his own vehicle was ready.

Merzario later built his own unsuccessful F1 car based on his old 761, which he and Simon Hadfield attempted to develop into a ground effect car. This programme was completely unsuccessful.

At the end of the 1977 season, the F1 team's assets and FOCA membership were sold to ATS (who had bought the Penske cars); Herd was retained by them as a consultant and was hence in the curious position of developing a development of his own 1975 car - and the 1978 ATS had some features reminiscent of contemporary March thinking. Mosley left the company to concentrate on FOCA matters.

Complete Formula One World Championship results 
(key) (results in bold indicate pole position; results in italics indicate fastest lap)

References 

March Formula One cars